Ned Rorem (1923–2022) was an American composer of contemporary classical music. Though best known for his many songs, his compositions also include operas, concertante, piano music as well as choral, chamber and orchestral works.

List of compositions

Operas
A Childhood Miracle, 1951, opera in one act
The Robbers, (1956), one-act opera
The Anniversary (1961), one-act opera
Miss Julie (1965)
Hearing (1966–1976), opera in five scenes
Bertha (1968), opera in one act
The Three Sisters Who Are Not Sisters (1968), three-act opera
Fables (1971), five very short operas to poems by Jean de la Fontaine:
The Animals Sick of the Plague
The Bird Wounded by an Arrow
The Fox and the Grapes
The Lion in Love
The Sun and the Frogs
Our Town (2005)

Orchestral works

Chamber

Vocal

Songs 
Norem's songs are with piano accompaniment, except where stated otherwise:

Choral

Solo instrumental

References

Sources
  

Rorem, Ned